Church Hill Grange Hall, near Hopkinsville, Kentucky, is a Grange hall that was built in 1878.  It served historically as a meeting hall.  It was listed on the National Register of Historic Places in 1975.

In 1975, it was owned by the Church Hill Community Club, successor to Church Hill Grange No. 109, and it was asserted to be the last surviving Grange hall in Kentucky.

References

Clubhouses on the National Register of Historic Places in Kentucky
National Register of Historic Places in Christian County, Kentucky
Grange buildings on the National Register of Historic Places
1878 establishments in Kentucky
Cultural infrastructure completed in 1878